Bhayandar is a suburb outside the Mumbai located near the Vasai Creek. It has a large Gujarati and Marwari population as well other mixed populations as well. It falls under the North Central ward of the Municipal Corporation.

Geography
Bhayander is located on the northern portion of Salsette Island and at the northern part of the Konkan region. Bhayandar comes under the jurisdiction of Mira Bhayandar Municipal Corporation. The entire Mira-Bhayandar region lies just outside Mumbai Suburban district and officially belongs to Thane district, despite being closer to the island of Mumbai. The Mira-Bhayandar region comprises an area of 79 km2. A vast creek divides the Mumbai suburban zones (in which Bhayander falls) and Vasai-Virar. In the north lies Vasai Creek, to the east Sanjay Gandhi National Park, and the Uttan coast to the west. It mainly is of Deccan lava terrain and consists of waterlogged and marshy areas. The climate is tropical, wet and dry.

References

External links 
 MBMC Official website

Mira-Bhayandar
Suburbs of Mumbai